Andricus quercuspetiolicola, also called the oak petiole gall wasp, is a species of oak gall wasp in the family Cynipidae. Galls in which the larvae live and feed are formed along the midrib or petiole of white oak leaves.

Range 
This species occurs throughout the eastern half of North America where its host plants grow.

Galls 

The oak petiole gall wasp forms galls on white oaks, including Quercus alba, Q. bicolor, Q. montana, Q. macrocarpa, Q. michauxii, Q. prinoides, and Q. stellata.

The galls of the sexual generation are round or club-shaped and formed on the petiole or midrib of the leaves in spring, with adults of both sexes emerging from galls in late June and early July. The gall is a firm swelling with a scar at the apex and contains several cells, each with a larva. It is initially green but becomes brown and woody as it ages.

The galls and timing of the agamic generation are unknown.

Parasitoids of the oak petiole gall wasp include the crypt-keeper wasp (Euderus set).

Taxonomy 
The adults were first described by Homer Franklin Bassett in 1863 with the name Cynips quercuspetiolicola, though the galls had been previously described by Carl Robert Osten-Sacken. This species is now considered to be in the genus Andricus, and several other names are considered synonyms.

References 

Cynipidae
Gall-inducing insects
Oak galls
Insects described in 1863
Insects of Canada
Hymenoptera of North America
Taxa named by Homer Franklin Bassett